Weaverville Joss House State Historic Park is a state park located in the center of the town of Weaverville, California.  The site is a Taoist temple which is still in use, and is the oldest Chinese temple in California.

History
The original temple was built by Chinese goldminers during California's 1849 gold rush.

The current building, called The Temple among the Trees Beneath the Clouds (雲林廟), was built in 1874 to replace earlier structures which had been destroyed by fires.  In 1934, much of the material in the building was taken during a robbery.  The state decided that, in order to protect the historic nature of the material, a local resident, Moon Lim Lee, would be named trustee for the site.  In 1956, the site officially became a state historic site.

In 1989, a box was left at the visitor's center.  It contained one of the Chinese Guardian Lions which had been stolen in the 1934 theft.  The state of California commissioned a new pair of dogs to place on display in the temple.  The new dogs were created by traditional craftsmen in China.

Much of the material on display inside the temple includes temple equipment, objects of Chinese art, mining tools, and weapons used in the 1854 Tong War. The temple's patron saints are Xuantian Shangdi  and Guan Di.

Current temple
Each year, to celebrate the Chinese New Year, a lion dance is performed.  The dance is also performed on every Fourth of July weekend.

The interior of the temple remains the same as it looked when it was built, although safety railings and electric lights have been added.  On the grounds, there is a recently added parking lot, visitor's center, and reflecting pool. Worship is still practiced at the temple but to preserve the exterior of the temple grounds, no incense burning is permitted.

The temple is located at the southwest corner of Main Street (California State Route 299) and Oregon Street in Weaverville.

See also
 Temple of Kwan Tai (武帝廟) located in Mendocino, California
 Bok Kai Temple (北溪廟) located in the city of Marysville, California
 Kong Chow Temple (岡州古廟) located in San Francisco, California
 Tin How Temple (天后古廟) in San Francisco's Chinatown, California
 Oroville Chinese Temple (列聖宮) located in Oroville, California
 Ma-Tsu Temple (美國舊金山媽祖廟朝聖宮) in San Francisco's Chinatown, California
 Thien Hau Temple (天后宮) located in Los Angeles's Chinatown in California

 California Historical Landmark

 California Historical Landmarks in Trinity County, California

References

External links
Weaverville Joss House Association (state of California official website)
state of California official website
Trinity County official website
City of Weaverville official website
Photo gallery
Video of the 2010 Lion Dance (official city of Weaverville video)

California State Historic Parks
Joss House
Chinese-American culture in California
Chinese-American museums in California
Parks in Trinity County, California
Museums in Trinity County, California
Taoist temples in the United States
California Historical Landmarks
History of Trinity County, California
Religious buildings and structures completed in 1874
Protected areas established in 1956
1956 establishments in California
Temples in California